The Silver Logie for Most Outstanding Entertainment Program is an award presented annually at the Australian TV Week Logie Awards. The award is given to recognise an outstanding Australian light entertainment series,  from various formats including comedy, panel, talent, variety, music, talk, and traditional game shows. The winner and nominees of this award are chosen by television industry juries.

It was first awarded at the 28th Annual TV Week Logie Awards ceremony, held in 1986 as Best Light Entertainment Program but has had many changes over the years.

In previous years, programs would have qualified in different categories such as Best Australian Comedy (1967-1968, 1972–1974), Best Comedy Show (1969), Best Comedy (1970). Also, Best Variety Show (1961-1962), Best National Variety Show (1964) and Best Musical/Variety Show.

The category was awarded as the Most Outstanding Achievement in Comedy Program from 1994 to 1998  but in 1999, the category was dropped. From 2000, the award category was restored as Most Outstanding Comedy Program.

In 2010, the category was changed to Most Outstanding Light Entertainment Program which included comedy panel, talent and variety shows. From 2015, the category was split into Most Outstanding Entertainment Program and a reinstated Most Outstanding Comedy Program category.  This award categories were eliminated again in 2018.

From 2019, the Most Outstanding Entertainment Program category was reinstated and includes comedy, panel, talent, variety, music, talk, and traditional game shows.

Winners and nominees

Listed below is the winner of the award for Best Light Entertainment Series:

See Logie Award for Most Outstanding Comedy Program for winners between 1994 and 2009.

Listed below are the winners of the award for each year for Most Outstanding Light Entertainment Series:

Listed below are the winners of the award for each year for Most Outstanding Entertainment Program from 2015 to 2017:

See also
 Logie Award for Most Popular Entertainment Program
 Logie Award for Most Outstanding Comedy Program
 Logie Award for Most Popular Comedy Program

References

External links

Awards established in 1986

1986 establishments in Australia